CFBI-FM is a Canadian radio station, broadcasting at 97.7 FM in Cambridge Bay, Nunavut. The station airs a community radio format with programming in both English and Inuinnaqtun.

External links
 

Fbi
Fbi